The 25th annual Tokyo International Film Festival (TIFF) was held from October 20 to October 28, 2012.

Official selection

Competition

Special screenings 

†: 12 minutes

Winds of Asia-Middle East 
†: Nominated for "Best Asian-Middle Eastern Film Award"

Film Panorama of Asia-Middle East 

††: Floating City was cancelled.

Indonesian Express: Nugroho, Edwin and Riza

Discovering Asian Cinema: Golden Slumbers of the Cambodian film history

Japanese Eyes 

†: Director Koji Wakamatsu Memorial Screening.

World Cinema

Natural TIFF

Miscellaneous

Special Presentation

TIFF in Nihombashi

Minato Screening 

†: Short film

Bunka-Cho Film Awards

Allied-events 
Bunka-Cho Film Week 2012
U. S. -Japan Film Academy
Tokyo International Women's Film Festival
TIFF / Tohoku project - Japan in a Day, a single strong step which links us to the future through "The Power of Films, Now!"
Symposium on Motion-Picture Filming
The Forest of the Asian Cinema
Masayuki Suo Film Festival
Korean Cinema Week 2012
Short Shorts Film Festival & Asia "Focus on Asia" & Workshop
China Film Week in Tokyo 2012
Future Line-up Collection of Tokyo International Film Festival
Tanabe-Benkei Film Festival 2012
Polish Film Festival in Japan 2012
CineGrid@TIFF 2012
Economic Contribution of the Japanese Film and Television Broadcast Industry
Regional Cooperation between Hong Kong and Japan
JFC Locations Fair 2012
Green Energy Festa in TIFF

Awards 
Competition
Tokyo Sakura Grand Prix - The Other Son by Lorraine Lévy
Special Jury Prize - Juvenile Offender by Kang Yi-kwan
Award for Best Director - Lorraine Lévy for The Other Son
Award for Best Actress - Neslihan Atagül for Araf - Somewhere in Between
Award for Best Actor - Seo Young-ju for Juvenile Offender
Award for Best Artistic Contribution - Ship of Theseus (Director of Photography: Pankaj Kumar)
The Audience Award - Flashback Memories 3D by Tetsuaki Matsue

Toyota Earth Grand Prix
Grand Prix - Himself He Cooks by Valerie Berteau and Philippe Witjes
Special Jury Prize - Trashed by Candida Brady

Winds of Asia-Middle East
Best Asian-Middle Eastern Film Award - Night of Silence by Reis Çelik
Special Mention
Bwakaw by Jun Robles Lana
Him, Here After by Asoka Handagama
Full Circle by Zhang Yang

Japanese Eyes
Best Picture Award - GFP Bunny by Yutaka Tsuchiya

TIFF Special Appreciation Award
TIFF Special Appreciation Award - Raymond Chow

Juries

Competition 
Roger Corman, American director and producer (President)
Luc Roeg, English producer
Yōjirō Takita, Japanese director
Emanuele Crialese, Italian screenwriter and director
Kyoko Heya, Japanese production designer

Winds of Asia-Middle East 
Harumi Nakayama, Japanese cinema journalist
Koichi Kawakami, Japanese director of photography
Lim Kah Wai, Malaysian director

Japanese Eyes 
Kyoichiro Murayama, Japanese critic
Yoshihiro Fukagawa, Japanese director
Genki Kawamura, Japanese producer

Toyota Earth Grand Prix 
Yukichi Shinada, Japanese critic
Masako, Japanese model and actress
Tatsumi Yoda, Chairman of Tokyo International Film Festival

References

External links 

 

Tokyo International Film Festival
T
T
Tokyo_International_Film_Festival
2012 in Tokyo